Events from the year 1619 in Sweden

Incumbents
 Monarch – Gustaf II Adolf

Events
 The Älvsborg Ransom (1613) is finally paid in full to the Danes, and Älvsborg is returned to Sweden.

Births
 Gustaf Adolf Lewenhaupt, soldier and politician  (died 1659)

Deaths

References

 
Years of the 17th century in Sweden
Sweden